Carex celebica is a tussock-forming perennial in the family Cyperaceae, that is native to parts of Malesia and Papua New Guinea.

See also
 List of Carex species

References

celebica
Plants described in 1940
Taxa named by Georg Kükenthal
Flora of Papua New Guinea
Flora of Sulawesi
Flora of Sumatra